Union Oil Company of California, and its holding company Unocal Corporation, together known as Unocal  was a major petroleum explorer and marketer in the late 19th century, through the 20th century, and into the early 21st century. It was headquartered in El Segundo, California, United States.

Unocal was involved in domestic and global energy projects. Unocal was one of the key players in the CentGas consortium, which attempted to build the Trans-Afghanistan Pipeline to run from the Caspian area, through Afghanistan, to the Indian Ocean, at a time after the Taliban siege of Kabul in 1996.

On August 10, 2005, Unocal merged its entire upstream petroleum business with Chevron and became a wholly-owned subsidiary. Unocal then ceased operations as an independent company, but continues to conduct many operations as Union Oil Company of California, a Chevron company.

History

The Union Oil Company of California was founded on October 17, 1890, in Santa Paula, California, by Lyman Stewart, Thomas Bard, and Wallace Hardison. It was a merger of three Southern Californian oil companies: the Sespe Oil Company and the Torrey Canyon Oil Company (both owned by Bard) and the Hardison and Stewart Oil Company. All three were notable as being completely unaffiliated with Standard Oil. Union Oil moved its headquarters to Los Angeles in 1901. The original headquarters in Santa Paula is a California Historical Landmark and museum.

About 1910, Union Oil made a strategic alliance with the Independent Producers Agency, a group of small oil producers, to build pipelines from the Kern County oil fields to Union Oil facilities on the Pacific coast. This gave the independent producers an alternative to what they perceived as the low prices paid by Standard Oil and the high freight rates charged by the railroads to move crude oil. It gave Union access to a large volume of crude oil. The situation was later fictionalized in the 2007 film There Will Be Blood.

In 1919, the Union Oil Company of Delaware was incorporated as a holding company for the Union Oil Company of California. In 1920, Union Oil purchased the Central Petroleum Company from the Texas Company. In 1922, the Union Oil Associates, Inc. was incorporated in California as a holding company to prevent control of the Union Oil Company of California passing to foreign interests after the merger of the Union Oil Company of Delaware with Royal Dutch Company.

In 1961, Union entered the Indonesian oil market. Henry L. Brandon, Union's vice president of international development wrote a "contract of work" arrangement, which was a first for Indonesia. In a speech on Indonesian Independence Day in August 1961, then president Sukarno talked at some length about "production sharing", which included language written into the contract by Union executives.

The company expanded to national status in 1965, when Union Oil merged with the Pure Oil Company, headquartered in what was then Palatine, Illinois, and now Schaumburg, Illinois. Over the next two decades, Union became the major oil producer in southern Alaska and a major natural gas producer in the Gulf of Mexico. The company was reorganized in 1983, and Union Oil Company of California became an operating subsidiary of a new Delaware-based holding company, Unocal Corporation. In 1985, Mesa Petroleum, controlled by billionaire T. Boone Pickens, attempted a takeover of Unocal Corp. that resulted in the Delaware Supreme Court landmark decision Unocal v. Mesa Petroleum, which upheld Unocal's takeover defense. Virtually all operations are conducted by Union Oil Company of California (Union Oil).

In 1977, Unocal acquired The Molybdenum Corporation of America (now Molycorp). Among the assets acquired was Mountain Pass rare earth mine, then the world's largest producer of rare earth elements.

In 1989, Unocal placed its midwest refining and marketing assets, including Union's  Lemont Refinery in Lemont, Illinois, into a 50/50 joint venture with Petróleos de Venezuela, S.A. (P.D.V.S.A.). The joint venture, known as the Uno-Ven Company, was headquartered in Arlington Heights, Illinois, and primarily comprising employees from Union Oil's then Schaumburg, Illinois, division headquarters and Lemont, Illinois, refinery. The joint venture was dissolved in 1997, with P.D.V.S.A. receiving full ownership. During the life of the joint venture, the familiar Union 76 brand name continued in full force. At the termination of the joint venture, most stations were converted to Citgo, which is controlled by P.D.V.S.A.

In 1997, Unocal sold its western United States refining and marketing operations to Tosco Corporation, including the rights to the Union 76 brand for refining and marketing (except in states where Uno-Ven operated). Tosco was later acquired by Phillips Petroleum, which later merged with Conoco to form ConocoPhillips.

Acquisition
In April 2005, the United States oil company Chevron made an offer to acquire Unocal for US$16.6 billion, which was followed, after the companies had agreed to the transaction, by a competing unsolicited bid from the Chinese firm CNOOC Limited of US$18.5 billion on June 22. The final Chevron offer of $17.9 billion was approved by Unocal shareholders on August 10. The final CNOOC bid was nearly 5% greater than that of Chevron, but faced significant political opposition from the United States Congress and was finally withdrawn by CNOOC August 2 citing the associated political uncertainty. Following a vote in the United States House of Representatives, the CNOOC bid was referred to President George W. Bush, on the grounds that its implications for national security needed to be reviewed.

Operations

Central Asia
Unocal was one of the key players in the CentGas consortium, an attempt to build the Trans-Afghanistan Pipeline to run from the Caspian area, through Afghanistan and probably Pakistan, to the Indian Ocean. One of the consultants to Unocal at that time was Zalmay Khalilzad, former US ambassador to Afghanistan, Iraq, and the United Nations.

In the 1980s, CIA chief Bill Casey had revived the agency's practice of gaining intelligence from traveling businessmen. Marty Miller, one of Unocal's top executives, conducted negotiations in several Central Asian countries from 1995, and voluntarily provided information gained on these trips to the CIA's Houston station.

In 1996, Unocal opened an office in Kandahar, Afghanistan, while the Taliban were in the process of taking control of the country.

In 1997,

Unocal seems to have had a deeper role. Intelligence "whistleblower" Julie Sirrs claimed that anti-Taliban leader Ahmad Shah Massoud told her he had "proof that Unocal had provided money that helped the Taliban take Kabul [in 1996]". And French journalist Richard Labeviere said, referring to the later 1990s, "The CIA and Unocal's security forces ... provided military weapons and instructors to several Taleban militia[s] ..." US State Department officials openly promoted the pipeline, and former Secretary of State Henry Kissinger served as a Unocal consultant.

The Taliban and Unocal were in negotiations in Texas to discuss arrangements for the gas pipeline from Turkmenistan to Pakistan in 1997 although it faced competition with from the Argentine Bridas Corporation.

While no deal was ultimately agreed with either company, the Taliban were leaning toward making a deal with Unocal as of August 1998. The company suspended work on the project following the U.S. cruise missile strikes on Afghanistan in response to the 1998 U.S. Embassy bombings and completely pulled out in December 1998 citing low oil prices and a need to cut costs in addition to regional instability.

Unocal was also the third-largest member of the Baku-Tbilisi-Ceyhan pipeline from the Caspian Sea to the Mediterranean Sea.

Indonesia
Unocal entered the Indonesian Market in 1961. Under the leadership of Henry L. Brandon (VP of International Development), Union Oil was the first US Oil Company to sign a production sharing agreement (contract of work) with President Suharto.

Sponsorships
Union Oil was the sponsor of the Major Burnham Bowling Trophy, an annual California bowling event supported by the Boy Scouts of America and named after Major Frederick Russell Burnham.

76 was the official fuel and motor oil of NASCAR from the sport's inaugural season in 1948 until the end of the 2003 season when Sunoco became the official fuel and Mobil 1 became the official motor oil. The 76 logo is often seen in Major League Baseball and National Football League stadiums on the west coast and a 76 gas station has been located in the Dodger Stadium parking lot for decades.

Controversy

Domestic US criticism
The event led to widespread criticism of both Union Oil and the offshore oil drilling industry, and was one of the events leading to the passage of the 1970 National Environmental Policy Act (NEPA).

Oil pipes under Avila Beach, California, leaked from the 1950s until 1996. A real estate firm determined the soil to be contaminated in 1989 and Unocal agreed to clean up the soil they contaminated.

Between the mid-1950s and 1994, Unocal leaked  of diluent—a petroleum derivative pumped into heavy oil fields to make the oil flow freely—under the Guadalupe-Nipomo Dunes and nearby ocean water, the largest oil spill in California's history. The pipelines had leaks in at least 90 places. Locals had noticed a strange sheen on the ocean surface, and dead seals and sea lions began washing up onto the beach. Although Unocal denied having any problems, records discovered by state fish and game officers disclosed that Unocal had long been aware of the leaks. Unocal has been actively cleaning up the site since the mid-90s, receiving praise from the Sierra Club for their habitat restoration work.

Doe v. Unocal

In the Doe v. Unocal case, Burmese villagers sued Unocal for complicity in forced labor, rape, torture, and murder. EarthRights International, the Center for Constitutional Rights, Paul Hoffman, Hadsell & Stormer, and Judith Brown Chomsky served as co-counsel to the plaintiffs. In 2005, a settlement agreement was reached to compensate the plaintiffs.

See also

Unocal Corp. v. Mesa Petroleum Co.

References
Eviatar, Daphne (May 9, 2005). A Big Win for Human Rights. The Nation.
Global Business vs. Global Justice NOW with Bill Moyers, January 9, 2004.
Howard, John E. (Oct. 2002). The Alien Tort Claims Act: Is Our Litigation-Run-Amok Going Global?. Retrieved Oct. 6, 2005.
Unocal. The story you haven't heard about. . . The Yadana Project in Myanmar Retrieved October 6, 2005.
Zagaris, Bruce (October 2002). US Asks US Court to Stop Human Rights Suit by Indonesian Villagers Against ExxonMobil for Counterterrorism Purposes. International Enforcement Law Reporter.

Footnotes

Further reading
 Welty, Earl M, and Frank J Taylor. The 76 bonanza: The fabulous life and times of the Union Oil Company of California (1966) 351pp

External links
 

 02
Defunct oil companies of the United States
Petroleum in California
Companies based in Los Angeles County, California
Defunct companies based in Greater Los Angeles
Chevron Corporation
Energy companies established in 1890
Non-renewable resource companies established in 1890
Non-renewable resource companies disestablished in 2005
1890 establishments in California
2005 disestablishments in California
2005 mergers and acquisitions
American companies established in 1890
American companies disestablished in 2005